Pseudochazara williamsi (Romei, 1927), the  grayling, is a species of butterfly in the family Nymphalidae. It is confined to the southern Spain (endemic).

Flight period 
The species is univoltine and is on wing from mid-June to early August.

Food plants
Larvae feed on grasses.

Taxonomy
Four taxa of Pseudochazara williamsi (endemism from SE. Iberian Peninsula, Spain) were described as subspecies of Pseudochazara hippolyte (Esper, 1784) (an Asian taxon). Some authors consider them only as ecotypes (ecological forms, local forms), see Gil-T. (2017): isolated populations adapted to a particular set of environmental conditions. In Pseudochazara the drawings of underside of the hind wings is very variable, result of an important phenotypic plasticity, due to its ability to change the phenotype in order to obtain a certain degree of mimetism required for camouflage with the terrain of its environment to mimic the environment where it lives. These ecological forms have no taxonomic rank in modern biological classification, therefore without taxonomical or nomenclatural significance, since there is no solid foundations to justify their subspecific validity.  Note: the old names of the taxa described, of very questionable validity, are indicated in brackets. The updated distribution and a morphological study (taxonomy) of P. williamsi can be seen in Gil-T. (2016, 2017).

References 

 Gil-T., F. (2016): Pseudochazara williamsi (Romei, 1927): updated distribution, corrected and extended with new localities (Lepidoptera, Nymphalidae, Satyrinae). [ISSN 2172-2595 |  Rev. gad. Entomol. vol. 7 (1): 429-439]. (Full article from researchgate.net. Text in Spanish with abstract in English): 
 Gil-T., F. (2017): Compared morphology and distribution of the taxa described of Pseudochazara williamsi (Romei, 1927) [= "Pseudochazara hippolyte" Esper from Spain]. Are they valid subspecies or only the result of phenotypic plasticity (ecological forms)? (Lepidoptera, Nymphalidae, Satyrinae). |ISSN 0171-0079| Atalanta vol. 48 (1-4): 188-196. (From researchgate.net. Text in English): 
 Pseudochazara de Lesse, 1951 (genus). In: Markku Savela's "Lepidoptera and Some Other Life Forms": 
 Pseudochazara williamsi. In: "Satyrinae of the Western Palearctic": 

Pseudochazara
Butterflies described in 1927
Butterflies described in 1973
Butterflies described in 1980
Butterflies described in 1993